Mater Admirabilis is a fresco depicting the Virgin Mary, in the monastery of the Trinità dei Monti, in Rome. It was painted by a young French artist, Pauline Perdrau, and has been associated with several miracles.

Legend 
Legend has it that Pauline asked the nuns at the Trinità dei Monti to paint a mural of the Blessed Virgin Mary. After weeks of painting, she finally finished her work. When the Mother Superior saw it, she said the colors were too bright and bold and immediately covered it with a large piece of fabric.

Years later, Pope Pius IX was visiting the church and questioned what was behind the cloth. The Mother Superior tried to distract the Pope from it, but he demanded to see it. When he drew back the fabric, it revealed what Pauline had painted years before, the colours having fading and blended together to create a much softer image. The Pope declared her Mater Admirabilis, “Mother Most Admirable”.

History 
Pope Leo XII offered the church and monastery of the Trinità dei Monti to the Religious of the Sacred Heart. Perdrau, born in 1817,  who would later become a Religious of the Sacred Heart, painted the fresco in 1844 during her postulancy. It was blessed under the name Mater Admirabilis by Pope Pius IX on October 20, 1846.  October 20 is the feast of Mater Admirabilis in the Roman Catholic Church, as observed by the Society of the Sacred Heart.

Sources 
Perdrau, Pauline, Les Loisiers de l'Abbaye: Souvenirs inédits de la Mère Pauline Perdrau sur la Vie de Notre Vénérée Mère Gœtz, Rome, Maison Mère, 1936

External links 
Religious of the Sacred Heart on Mater Admirabilis
The symbolism in Mater Admirabilis

Catholic paintings
Virgin Mary in art